Dastjerdeh or Dast Jerdeh may refer to:
 Dastjerdeh, Isfahan
 Dastjerdeh, Kermanshah
 Dastjerdeh, Ashtian, Markazi Province
 Dastjerdeh, Shazand, Markazi Province
 Dast Jerdeh, Zanjan
 Dast Jerdeh Rural District, in Zanjan Province

See also
Dastjordeh (disambiguation)